Emily Nonnen (22 February 1812 — 19 January 1905) was a British-Swedish writer, translator and artist.

Biography
Emily Nonnen was born 22 February 1812, London, Great Britain. She was the sister of Mary, Charlotte, Ann and Edward Nonnen. She moved to her maternal uncle in Sweden from Great Britain as a child.  She was educated at the Societetsskolan.

She wrote novels for young adults and translated English literature to Swedish, among them Alice’s Adventures in Wonderland by Lewis Carroll. She also translated Swedish-language poets’ work into English.

She died 19 January 1905, in Gothenburg, Sweden.

Legacy
The Nonnensgatan (Nonnenstreet) in Bö in Gothenburg was named after the Nonnen sisters in 1944.

References

Bibliography 
 Nonnen, Emily; Holmgren, Greta, ed. (2008). Systrarna på Liseberg: anteckningar ur familjen Nonnens brev och dagböcker. [New edition.] Göteborg: Kabusa. Libris 10602400.  (inb.)

Further reading 
 

1812 births
1905 deaths
19th-century Swedish writers
19th-century British novelists
19th-century British translators
19th-century British women writers
19th-century British writers
British emigrants to Sweden
English–Swedish translators
Translators to English